Amanda Jane "AJ" Jennings (formerly Reynolds, born 7 October 1971) is an Australian paracanoeist who has won two gold medals at the ICF Canoe Sprint World Championships. She won a silver medal in the Women's 200m KL3 at the 2016 Rio Paralympics.

Personal

Jennings was born on 7 October 1971 and lives in Macclesfield, Victoria. In April 2012, Jennings underwent elective surgery to amputate the lower part of her right leg. For 20 years before the amputation, Jennings lived with depression, chronic pain and an addiction to prescriptive drugs following complications from a dislocated knee. In reflecting to life after the amputation, Jennings commented: "Everybody's got the opportunity. You've just got to have the courage to take it."

She is an Equine Sports Therapist. Jennings is married to Wayne and they have two children.

Sporting career
Jennings is classified as KL3 paracanoeist. Reynolds paddling career started with the Murray Marathon and participated in the 2013 Sale to Sea Disability Kayak Challenge. In 2014, she won the K1 200 m, K1 500 m  and 1000 m LTA events at the National and Oceania Championships. In her world championships debut, she won the bronze medal in the Women's K1 200 m LTA at the 2014 ICF Canoe Sprint World Championships in Moscow, Russia. At the 2015 ICF Canoe Sprint World Championships in Milan, Italy, she won the gold medal in the Women's K–1 200 m KL3.

At the 2016 ICF Paracanoe World Championships, Duisburg, Germany, she won the silver medal in the Women's 200 m KL3.  A month prior to the championships, she underwent an appendix operation. She won a silver medal in the 200m KL3 at the 2016 Rio Paralympics where paracanoe made it Paralympics debut.

At the 2017 ICF Canoe Sprint World Championships, Račice, Czech Republic, she won the gold medal in Women's KL2 200m. After a year of battling injury, Reynolds at 2018 ICF Canoe Sprint World Championships, Montemor-o-Velho, won the silver medal in the Women’s KL3 200m.

At the 2019 ICF Canoe Sprint World Championships, Szeged, Hungary, she finished seventh in the Women’s KL3 200m.

At the 2020 Summer Paralympics, Jennings finished fifth in her Heat and eighth in the Women's KL3 semi-final and did not advance to the final. 

Jennings is a Victorian Institute of Sport scholarship holder and was originally coached by Steve Vegh and Mark Dougall. In 2015, she moved to the Gold Coast, Queensland to work closer with National Para-canoe Head Coach Andrea King. She named her new sprint canoe "Douglas" or "Doug" after two people that have inspired her - boxer James ‘buster’ Douglas and pilot Douglas Bader.

Recognition
In 2015 and 2016, she was awarded the People's Choice Award at the Australian Canoeing Awards.

References

External links
 
 
 Amanda Reynolds at Paddle Australia
 

1971 births
Living people
Australian female canoeists
Australian amputees
Paracanoeists of Australia
Paralympic medalists in paracanoe
Paralympic silver medalists for Australia
Paracanoeists at the 2016 Summer Paralympics
Paracanoeists at the 2020 Summer Paralympics
Medalists at the 2016 Summer Paralympics
LTA classification paracanoeists
Sportswomen from Victoria (Australia)
ICF Canoe Sprint World Championships medalists in paracanoe